The 2005 Minneapolis City Council elections were held on November 8, 2005 to elect the 13 members of the Minneapolis City Council for four-year terms.

The election saw the Minnesota Democratic–Farmer–Labor Party (DFL) make a net gain of two seats, giving them a 12-to-1 majority in the Council. Both incumbent Green Party of Minnesota members lost their seats, though the party secured a pickup in Ward 2 with Cam Gordon narrowly winning against the DFL-endorsed candidate. The only independent on the Council lost their seat.

Electoral system
Members were elected from single-member districts. Municipal elections in Minnesota are nonpartisan, although candidates were able to identify with a political party on the ballot.

References

Minneapolis City Council
Minneapolis 2005
2005 Minnesota elections
Local elections in Minnesota